Kalanga (also Romanized as Kalangā; also known as Kalangāh) is a village in Karipey Rural District, Lalehabad District, Babol County, Mazandaran Province, Iran. At the 2006 census, its population was 454, in 103 families.

References 

Populated places in Babol County